Craig Davis may refer to:
Craig Davis (American football) (Craig Davis, born 1985), American football wide receiver
Craig Davis (Australian footballer) (born 1954), Australian rules footballer
Craig Davis (author), author and Middle East and South Asia expert

See also
Craig Davies (disambiguation)